Honey in the Lion's Head is an album by folk singer/guitarist Greg Brown. It is his second release on the Trailer Records label.

Of the 12 tracks, ten are traditional songs. One is Jim Garland’s Depression-era classic, “I Don’t Want Your Millions Mister”, and the other is a Brown original. Brown's wife, Iris DeMent and daughters Constie and Pieta Brown join on background vocals.

Reception

Writing for Allmusic, music critic Ronnie D. Lankford, Jr. wrote "Despite Brown's lethargic pacing, fans of traditional music will be glad someone dusted off these venerable songs and put a bit of life in them." Jim Musser of No Depression wrote of Brown's song choices "the flexible lyrics and deathless tunes of his youth have always remained true, and he more than repays the debt he owes them."

Writing for  PopMatters, Seth Limmer was equivocal about the release, calling the album "a good listen, although nowhere near as compelling as any of Brown’s original work. The breathtaking moments are few and far between."

Track listing
All songs Traditional, arranged by Greg Brown; except where indicated.
 "Railroad Bill" – 4:06
 "I Believe I'll Go Back Home" – 4:45
 "Who Killed Cock Robin" – 4:09
 "Old Smokey" – 4:54
 "The Foggy Dew" – 3:58
 "Down in the Valley" – 5:22
 "Ain't No One Like You" (Greg Brown) – 2:34
 "Green Grows the Laurel" – 4:08
 "I Don't Want Your Millions Mister" (Jim Garland) – 2:47
 "I Never Will Marry" – 3:35
 "Samson" – 3:54
 "Jacob's Ladder" – 3:11

Personnel
Greg Brown – vocals, guitar
Bob Black – banjo, 5-string guitar
Bo Ramsey – guitar
Rick Cicalo – bass
Keith Dempster – harmonica on "Railroad Bill"
Iris DeMent – background vocals (on "Jacob's Ladder")
Constie Brown – background vocals
Pieta Brown – background vocals
Al Murphy – fiddle, mandolin, background vocals

References

Greg Brown (folk musician) albums
2004 albums